Arroyomolinos is a municipality of the autonomous community of Madrid in central Spain. As of 2019, it had a population of 31,396.

References

External links 

Municipalities in the Community of Madrid